The Ashtabharya or Ashta-bharya(s) is the group of eight principal queen-consorts of Hindu god Krishna, the king of Dvaraka in the Dvapara Yuga (epoch). The most popular list, found in the Bhagavata Purana, includes: Rukmini, Satyabhama, Jambavati, Kalindi, Mitravinda, Nagnajiti, Bhadra, and Lakshmana. Variations exist in the Vishnu Purana and the Harivamsa, which includes queens called Madri or Rohini, instead of Bhadra. Most of them were princesses.

In Hinduism, all of Krishna's consorts including Radha are revered as the avatars of the goddess Lakshmi while the Gopis of Braj are considered as Radha's manifestations.

Rukmini, the princess of Vidarbha was Krishna's first wife and chief queen (Patrani) of Dvaraka. She is considered as the avatar of Sridevi, the goddess of prosperity. Satyabhama, the third wife, a Yadava princess, is considered as Lakshmi's aspect of the earth-goddess Bhudevi. Jambavati is believed to be the manifestation of the third aspect of Lakshmi, Niladevi. Kalindi, the goddess of the river Yamuna, is worshipped independently. Besides the Ashtabharya, Krishna had 16,000 or 16,100 ceremonial wives.
 
The texts also mention the many children Krishna fathered by the Ashtabharya, the most prominent being the crown-prince Pradyumna, son of Rukmini.

Summary

 Key

 Abbreviations
 General:
 f: father
 m: mother
 d: daughter, unless specified otherwise, child is a son.
 ?: Statement is disputed
 Scriptures
 BP: Bhagavata Purana
 Mbh: Mahabharata
 VP: Vishnu Purana
 HV: Harivamsa
 PP: Padma Purana

 Table

Symbolism
The hierarchy of the wives is under three groups according to their regal status and symbolizes Krishna's sovereignty. In the first group, Rukmini, an avatar of the Material Prakriti (Shri), stands for majesty and wealth of Krishna; Satyabhama, the avatar of the Elemental Prakriti( Bhudevi ), represents the kingdom and the realm of the Lord as well. Jambavati is Victory (Vijaya), who was won by defeating her father. The second group were representatives of Aryavarta (the nobility) with Kalindi given the central kingdoms, Nagnajiti representing the eastern kingdoms (including the Solar dynasty) and Lakshmana representing the western side. The third group of wives consisted of Mitravinda and Bhadra his patriarchal cousins representing his Yadava clan called Satvata.

Legends

Rukmini, the chief consort of Krishna, heard the tales of the hero and fell in love with him. While her parents consented to her wedding with her groom of choice, Rukmini's brother Rukmi fixed her marriage with his friend Shishupala. Rukmini sent a message to Krishna to rescue her from her fate and wed her. Krishna abducted Rukmini during her svayamvara, after battling her brother Rukmi. Krishna's army commanded by his brother Balarama defeat Rukmi and the other kings, who follow Krishna and Rukmini. Rukmini is traditionally considered to be the favourite and the primary wife of Krishna, the latter's partiality towards her often provoking the ire of his second consort of Satyabhama.

The marriage of Satyabhama and Jambavati to Krishna is closely linked to the story of Syamantaka, the precious diamond given by the Sun-god Surya to his devotee Satrajit, father of Satyabhama. Krishna requests Satrajit to present the gem to the Yadava elder Ugrasena, which the latter refuses and instead presents it to his brother Prasena. Prasena wears it on a hunting expedition, where he is killed by a lion, who is in turn killed by Jambavan, the bear-king. When accused by Satrajit of stealing the jewel, Krishna goes in its search and finally following trials of the corpses of Prasena and the lion, confronts Jambavan. After 27/28 day duel, Jambavan - the devotee of Rama (Vishnu's previous avatar) - surrenders to Krishna, who he realizes is none other than Vishnu. He returns the gem and gives Jambavati to Krishna. When the presumed dead Krishna returns to Dvaraka, a humiliated Satrajit begs his forgiveness and offers Satyabhama's hand in marriage along with the jewel.

Among the queens, Satyabhama is depicted to be the most beautiful and loving wife. Not only was Satyabhama a very courageous and strong-willed woman, but she was also skillful in archery. She even accompanied Krishna to kill the demon Narakasura. While Krishna kills the demon in Krishna-oriented scriptures, Satyabhama, the manifestation of Bhudevi - the mother of Narakasura, kills the demon to fulfil a curse that he will be killed by his mother in Goddess-centric texts. At Satyabhama's behest, Krishna also defeats Indra, the king of heaven and the gods and gets the celestial parijata tree for her after he had previously acquired it for Rukmini.

Indian folktales often tell stories of Krishna's competing wives, especially Rukmini and Satyabhama. A tale narrates how once Satyabhama, proud of her wealth, donated Krishna to the divine sage Narada and pledged to take him back by donating wealth to him as much as Krishna's weight. Krishna sat on one pan of a weighing scale and Satyabhama filled the other pan with all of the wealth, inherited from her father, but it could not equal Krishna's weight. The other wives, except Rukmini, followed suit but Krishna's pan did not leave the ground. The wives requested Satyabhama to approach Rukmini. A helpless Satyabhama asked her foremost rival, Rukmini, for help. Rukmini had no wealth of her own. She chanted a prayer and put the holy tulsi leaf in the other pan, as the symbol of her love; removing the wealth of Satyabhama and the other queens from the pan. Krishna's pan was suddenly lifted into the air and the other pan touched the earth, even though only a tulsi leaf in it.

See also
Junior wives of Krishna

References

Consorts of Krishna
Characters in the Bhagavata Purana
Characters in the Mahabharata